The Colony of Liberia, later the Commonwealth of Liberia, was a private colony of the American Colonization Society (ACS) beginning in 1822. It became an independent nation—the Republic of Liberia—after declaring independence in 1847.

Early status and settlements

It is unclear whether or not Liberia was ever technically a colony at all. Unlike most other colonies in the 19th century, it had no charter and had no official allegiance or relationship with a sovereign nation. As one early report explained, "The Colony belongs to, and is under the immediate control and jurisdiction of the Board of Managers of the American Colonization Society." Even after it had declared independence in 1847 and established itself as a republic in 1848, few nations recognized its sovereignty. Indeed, the United States did not recognize Liberia's independence until 1862, after the southern states had seceded and formed the Confederate States of America at the beginning of the American Civil War.

The American Colonization Society did not act alone in creating the colony. Much of what would become Liberia was a collection of independent settlements sponsored by state colonization societies: Mississippi-in-Africa, Kentucky-in-Africa, Louisiana, Virginia, and several others. In the decades before Liberia's independence, these separate colonies systematically came together to form and expand the Colony of Liberia, and in 1839, they formed the Commonwealth of Liberia, defined by a stronger union and an increased dedication to home rule.

Preparations
In 1815, Paul Cuffee attempted a settlement for freedmen on Sherbro Island, but it failed within five years and the survivors fled to Sierra Leone. In 1816, leaders like Henry Clay, Robert Finley, and Francis Scott Key, formed the American Colonization Society, with the purpose of relocating freedmen to the Pepper Coast. In 1820, they sent the ship Elizabeth with three American agents and eighty-six freemen to Sherbro Island, but malaria and disease killed many colonists as well as all three agents. In 1821, the Nautilus arrived with two agents of the society, two agents from the United States government and thirty-three additional settlers and promptly decided to abandon Sherbro Island, as soon as a suitable replacement could be found.

First colony
 
After numerous failed negotiations to secure land along the coast, the American Colonization Society sent two agents, Robert F. Stockton and Eli Ayres to negotiate with local chieftains to secure a place for colonization. A conference was held at Cape Mesurado, which the locals called Ducor. Under the terms of the Ducor Contract, signed by Gola chiefs Kaanda Njola of Sao's Town and Long Peter of Klay; Dei chief Kai-Peter of Stockton Creek; Kru chief Bah Gwogro (also George) of Old Kru Town; and chief Jimmy from St. Paul River, the Society acquired Cape Mesurado and land on Dozoa Island in the bay. They established a settlement on Dozoa Island, which they renamed Perseverance. It was difficult for the early settlers, made of mostly free-born blacks who had been denied the full rights of United States citizenship. In Liberia, the native Africans resisted the expansion of the colonists, resulting in many armed conflicts between them. Nevertheless, in the next decade 2,638 African Americans migrated to the area. Also, the colony entered an agreement with the U.S. Government to accept freed slaves who were taken from illegal slave ships.

Expansion and growth
According to J. N. Danforth, General Agent of the Society, as of 1832 "the legislature[s] of fourteen States, among which are New Hampshire, Vermont, Connecticut, New York, New Jersey, Pennsylvania, Delaware, Ohio, and Indiana, and nearly all the ecclesiastical bodies in the United States[,] have recommended the Society to the patronage of the American people."

From the establishment of the colony, the American Colonization Society had employed mostly white agents to govern the colony. In 1842, Joseph Jenkins Roberts, a mixed-race, freeborn man from Petersburg, Virginia, became the first non-white governor of Liberia. In 1847, the legislature of Liberia declared itself an independent state, with Roberts as its first President.

Mortality
Tropical diseases were a major problem for the settlers, and the new immigrants to Liberia suffered the highest mortality rates since accurate record-keeping began. Of the 4,571 emigrants who arrived in Liberia between 1820 and 1843, only 1,819—40%—were alive in 1843. The ACS knew of the high death rate, but continued to send more people to the colony. Professor Shick writes:

Notes

References

American colonization movement
History of Liberia
Slavery in the United States